In German folklore, the figure of the Freischütz  is a marksman who, by a contract with the devil, has obtained a certain number of bullets destined to hit without fail whatever object he wishes. As the legend is usually told, six of the magic bullets (German: Freikugeln) are thus subservient to the marksman's will, but the seventh is at the absolute disposal of the devil himself.

Apel's Freischütz
Stories about the Freischütz were especially common in Germany during the 14th, 15th and 16th centuries. But the tale became widely circulated in 1810 when Johann August Apel included it as the first tale in the first volume of the Gespensterbuch ('Book of Ghosts'). Thomas de Quincey translated Apel's tale into English as "The Fatal Marksman" in Popular Tales and Romances of the Northern Nations (1823), another translation was published under the title "Der Freischütz; or, The Magic Balls" in Mary Diana Dods' Tales of the Wild and the Wonderful (1825), and a third translation was published anonymously as The Original Legend of Der Freischütz, or the Free Shot (1833).

Weber's opera
Apel's tale formed the subject of Weber's opera Der Freischütz (1821), the libretto of which was written by Johann Friedrich Kind, who had suggested Apel's story as an excellent theme for the composer.

E. T. A. Hoffmann
E. T. A. Hoffmann's The Affianced Spectre (1847) is another variant. In this story, after the seventh bullet shoots Wilhelm's mistress, Catherine, instead of the game at which Wilhelm aimed, the devil triumphs at Wilhelm's misery. Wilhelm marries another woman at the end of the year, despite having sworn an oath at Catherine's grave to remain single for the rest of his life. Out of grief, Wilhelm takes a solitary excursion into the forest. As he rides, he hears the wild huntsman, his pack, and wolves chasing after him. A thunderbolt throws Wilhelm from the horse. A mysterious voice commands Wilhelm to follow and leads him to a cavern, where Wilhelm sees many skeletons, one of which is that of Catherine; the skeleton waltzes with Wilhelm. Other skeletons join the dance until daybreak. The following morning, Wilhelm and his horse are found dead and gnawed by the wolves.

Slovene version
Similar tales are also known from the Slavic mythology, where the marksman, named Lampert, is sometimes called čarostrelec.

References

External links

 

German culture
German folklore
Marksmanship
Slovene mythology